Heart Beats Pacific is the third studio album by the American punk band Banner Pilot. The album was recorded in June and July 2011 and was then released by Fat Wreck Chords on CD and LP on October 25 the same year. Heart Beats Pacific is the second studio album by Banner Pilot on this label.

Track listing 
 "Alchemy" – 2:15
 "Forty Degrees" – 2:15
 "Red Line" – 3:11
 "Spanish Reds" – 3:28
 "Eraser" – 2:50
 "Expat" – 3:55
 "Isolani" – 3:12
 "Calling Station" – 3:23
 "Western Terminal" – 3:32
 "Intervention" – 3:43
 "Division Street" – 5:05

Performers 
 Nick Johnson - vocals, guitar
 Nate Gangelhoff - guitar, bass
 Corey Ayd - guitar, vocals
 Dan Elston-Jones - drums

References 

2011 albums
Fat Wreck Chords albums
Banner Pilot albums